Gene Leahy Mall, also known locally as Central Park or The Mall, is a  park located at 1302 Farnam on the Mall in Downtown Omaha, Nebraska, U.S.A., and bordered by South 10th Street. There are also two huge slides, a sculpture garden, a remote-control boat cove, a large children's play area, and an amphitheater where outdoor concerts are held in the summer. The mall is decorated with thousands of lights during the winter holiday season. Connected on its eastern edge with the Heartland of America Park, it is also borders the W. Dale Clark Library, the former Burlington Headquarters Building, the Old Market and the ConAgra campus.

About
Originally conceived in the 1970s, the Gene Leahy Mall was named after Omaha Mayor Eugene A. Leahy, and is regarded as being a major impetus for the redevelopment of downtown into a thriving commercial, residential and cultural center in Omaha. In 2005 a major redevelopment process began focused on redesigning The Mall and several areas surrounding the Old Market.

In July 2022, the redevelopment of The Mall was completed featuring a new concert venue pavilion, open lawn area, and redesigned waterfront walkway while retaining the iconic metal slides.

See also
 Parks in Omaha, Nebraska

References

Parks in Omaha, Nebraska